Olympique Lyonnais Féminin (commonly referred to as  Olympique Lyon, Lyon, or simply OL) is a French women's football club based in Lyon. The club has been the female section of Olympique Lyonnais since 2004. It is the most successful club in the history of Division 1 Féminine, with fifteen league titles as Olympique Lyonnais and four league titles as FC Lyon before the acquisition. Lyon currently plays in Division 1 Féminine.

Since the 2010s, Lyon has frequently been named the strongest women's team in the world, and has been cited as a model for the development of women's football in both economic and cultural terms. The team has won eight Champions League titles, including a record five successive titles from 2016 to 2020, as well as 14 consecutive domestic league titles from 2007 to 2020. They have also won five trebles when the top-level continental competition is considered, the most for any team.

History
The club was formed as the women's section of FC Lyon in 1970. In 2004, the women's club became the women's section of Olympique Lyonnais. Since joining Lyon, the women's section has won the Division 1 Féminine fourteen times and the Coupe de France nine times. Lyon reached the semi-finals of the 2007–08 edition of the UEFA Women's Cup and, during the 2009–10 season, reached the final of the inaugural edition of the UEFA Women's Champions League, losing to German club Turbine Potsdam 7–6 on penalties. In the following season, Lyon finally captured the UEFA Women's Champions League, defeating its nemesis Turbine Potsdam 2–0 in the 2011 final. It successfully defended its title in 2012, defeating FFC Frankfurt in the final.

From 2016 to 2020, the club won five consecutive Champions League titles, equaling the male record held by Real Madrid. Three players: Sarah Bouhaddi, Wendie Renard and Eugenie Le Sommer have all won eight Champions League trophies.

Lyon's main rivalry is with Paris Saint-Germain, with matches between the two teams sometimes referred as the "Classique féminin". Paris is OL's main contender for national titles, as they finished in second place of D1 Féminine seven times. Lyon has never lost the D1 title to PSG until 2021 when PSG finished ahead of Lyon, and won five Coupe de France finals against Paris. In 2017 both teams reached the Champions League final, with Lyon beating Paris after a penalty shoot-out and winning its fourth title in the competition.

Lyon hosts its matches at the Groupama OL training Center, a stadium of capacity 1,524 that is situated not far from the larger Parc Olympique Lyonnais where the male teams play. The women's team does host its "big" matches at the 59,000-seat stadium. The president of the club is Jean-Michel Aulas and the captain of the team is Wendie Renard. According to the UEFA women's coefficient, Lyon is currently the highest-ranked club in UEFA.

Players

Current squad

Reserve team

Out on loan

Notable former players 

French
 Camille Abily
 Élodie Thomis
 Corine Petit
 Sonia Bompastor
 Louisa Necib
 Laura Georges
 Élise Bussaglia
 Hoda Lattaf
 Sabrina Viguier
 Sandrine Brétigny
 Sandrine Dusang
 Delphine Blanc
 Laëtitia Tonazzi
 Jessica Houara
 Claire Lavogez
 Pauline Peyraud-Magnin
 Kenza Dali
 Kheira Hamraoui
 Ève Périsset
 Claire Morel
 Séverine Creuzet-Laplantes

Brazilian
 Kátia
 Rosana
 Simone
Chinese
 Wang Fei
Costa Rican
 Shirley Cruz
Danish
 Dorte Dalum Jensen
 Line Røddik Hansen
Dutch
 Shanice van de Sanden
English
 Lucy Bronze
 Alex Greenwood
 Izzy Christiansen

German
 Josephine Henning
 Pauline Bremer
 Carolin Simon
Japanese
 Saki Kumagai
 Shinobu Ohno
 Ami Otaki
New-Zealander
 Erin Nayler
Nigerian
 Cynthia Uwak
Norwegian
 Christine Colombo Nilsen
 Isabell Herlovsen
 Bente Nordby
 Ingvild Stensland
 Andrea Norheim
Portuguese
 Jéssica Silva

Swedish
 Amelie Rybäck
 Lotta Schelin
 Caroline Seger
Swiss
 Lara Dickenmann
American
 Lorrie Fair
 Megan Rapinoe
 Hope Solo
 Aly Wagner
 Christie Welsh
 Alex Morgan
 Morgan Brian
Welsh
 Jess Fishlock

Current staff

Honours

Official
Division 1 Féminine (Champions of France) (level 1)
(15, record): 2006–07, 2007–08, 2008–09, 2009–10, 2010–11, 2011–12, 2012–13, 2013–14, 2014–15, 2015–16, 2016–17, 2017–18, 2018–19, 2019–20, 2021–22
Coupe de France Féminine
(9, record): 2007–08, 2011–12, 2012–13, 2013–14, 2014–15, 2015–16, 2016–17, 2018–19, 2019–20
Trophée des Championnes
(2, record) 2019, 2022
UEFA Women's Champions League
(8, record): 2010–11, 2011–12, 2015–16, 2016–17, 2017–18, 2018–19, 2019–20, 2021–22

Invitational
International Women's Club Championship
Winners: 2012

Valais Cup
Winners: 2014

Women's International Champions Cup
Winners: 2019, 2022

Trophée Veolia Féminin
Winners: 2020

Others
 Guinness world record for most consecutive victories in all competitions: 41 wins (from 28 April 2012 to 18 May 2013).

Record in UEFA Women's Champions League

All results (away, home and aggregate) list Lyon's goal tally first.

f First leg.

List of seasons

Top scorers in bold were also the top scorers in the Division 1 Féminine that season.

See also

 Division 1 Féminine
 Olympique Lyonnais, the main men's team in Lyon, owned by Olympique Lyonnais Féminin's owner OL Groupe
 OL Reign, a women's team in Seattle, also owned by OL Groupe

References

External links

 
 Club at uefa.com

 
Women's football clubs in France
Football clubs in Lyon
Olympique Lyonnais
Association football clubs established in 1970
Association football clubs established in 2004
1970 establishments in France
2004 establishments in France
Division 1 Féminine clubs